Bear Valley Buttes is a geologic feature that overlooks Bear Valley in Colusa County, California. The Buttes are approximately 1.5 miles long and its highest peak stands at 2,166 ft (660 m) above sea level. The Buttes are composed from the upturned marine sediments of the Great Valley Sequence that once formerly made up the floor of the Central Valley.

References 

Colusa County, California
Cretaceous California